Mateh Kola (also Romanized as Mateh Kolā; also known as Mad Kolū and Mad Kūlā) is a village in Kaseliyan Rural District, in the Central District of Savadkuh County, Mazandaran Province, Iran. At the 2006 census, its population was 291, in 65 families.

References 

Populated places in Savadkuh County